had many names, each depending on the period of its existence, and the circumstances at that time. Many of the names were acronyms that were derived from its military name or designation, which changed from time to time.   The arsenal was sometimes known as "Kūgi-shō" (空技廠, a contraction of "Kōkū Gijutsu-shō" 航空技術廠). The name Yokosuka prevailed however, even though it referred to the Arsenal's location at Yokosuka, Japan.

History
The air arsenal's roots go back to 1869 when the Imperial Japanese Navy (IJN) established a naval arsenal at Yokosuka, about 13 miles south of Yokohama on Tokyo Bay. The arsenal provided ship building, repair and replenishment to the Japanese Navy. It was also a storage depot where munitions and other assorted supplies were brought as they were purchased.

When a number of foreign aircraft were purchased for evaluation, the Navy brought them to the arsenal for processing. The arsenal assembled the aircraft from their shipping boxes, and when assembled, they were flown by the pilots who had been sent abroad for flying lessons and evaluate the aircraft flown.

Modifications to these aircraft were done as weaknesses were found, or when an improvement was incorporated.  To facilitate this work, the IJN established the Aeroplane Factory, Ordnance Department at the arsenal's torpedo factory in May 1913.

The arsenal was renamed  in December 1919. The  name  was assigned by April, 1923, when the arsenal was moved to Tsukiji with several other Naval support units. The entire Tsukiji facility was destroyed in the 1923 Great Kantō earthquake. Several names were used when the navy began establishment of the arsenal. Research was started again in 1924 when several aircraft were evaluated. A large amount of draftsmen and Designers were transferred from the Hiro Naval Arsenal, ending aircraft production there.

The war years
During World War II, the arsenal was responsible for the design of several IJN aircraft, although the arsenal itself did not manufacture more than a few prototypes of the aircraft it designed. Aircraft designed by the arsenal are usually designated by the manufacturer's letter "Y" for "Yokosuka".

An example of the above is the Yokosuka D4Y1 which was mainly produced by Aichi.

Aircraft

Torpedo bomber
Yokosuka Twin-engined Seaplane - 1916 biplane torpedo bomber; first Japanese twin-engine aircraft
B3Y -  -1933 biplane torpedo bomber
B4Y -  - 'Jean' 1936 biplane torpedo bomber

Dive bomber
D2Y - prototype dive bomber, lost to the Aichi D1A  
D3Y -  or  - 1945 two-seat dive bomber/trainer based on the Aichi D3A
D4Y -  - 'Judy' 1942 two-seat carrier-based dive bomber
D5Y -  - Kamikaze version of the D3Y

Reconnaissance aircraft
Yokosuka Nakajima Tractor - 1915 reconnaissance seaplane
Ho-go Otsu-gata Seaplane - 1916 reconnaissance seaplane
Ho-go Small Seaplane - 1917 reconnaissance seaplane
Ro-go Ko-gata - 1918 reconnaissance floatplane 
D4Y1-C -  - 1942 ship-based reconnaissance version of D4Y, produced by Aichi
E1Y -  - 1923 reconnaissance floatplane
Tatsu-go Reconnaissance Seaplane - 1925 reconnaissance seaplane prototype
1-go Reconnaissance Seaplane - 1925 submarine-based reconnaissance seaplane
E5Y -  - 1930 reconnaissance floatplane
E6Y -  - 1933 submarine-based reconnaissance floatplane
E14Y -  - 'Glen' 1941 submarine-based reconnaissance floatplane
R1Y -  - prototype reconnaissance aircraft
R2Y -  - 1945 prototype reconnaissance aircraft

Flying boat
H5Y -  - 'Cherry' 1939 maritime reconnaissance flying boat
H7Y - 'Tillie' 1939 prototype flying boat

Trainer
I-go Ko-gata - 1920 seaplane trainer
K1Y -  - 1925 biplane trainer
K2Y -  - Japanese-built Avro 504
K4Y -  - 1933 floatplane trainer
K5Y -  -'Willow' 1934 biplane trainer

Transport
L3Y -  - Yokosuka-built transport version of Mitsubishi G3M

Special purpose
MXY1 - 1939 experimental parasol monoplane for aerodynamic research; built by Watanabe
MXY2
MXY3 - experimental radio-controlled target glider (drone)
MXY4 - experimental radio-controlled target aircraft (drone)
MXY5 - transport glider
MXY6 - unpowered gliders for development of the Kyushu J7W
MXY7 -  - 'Baka' 1945 rocket-powered kamikaze attack aircraft
MXY8 -  - training glider based on the Mitsubishi J8M; known as Ku-13 in IJA service
MXY9 -  - motorjet powered version of MXY-8 (project only)
MXY10 - ground non-flying decoy of P1Y
MXY11  - ground non-flying decoy of Mitsubishi G4M

Bomber
P1Y  - 'Frances' 1944 twin-engine bomber
 - jet-powered version of the P1Y (project only)

References

Notes

Bibliography
Francillon, R.J. Japanese Aircraft of the Pacific War, Putnam, London, 1970, SBN 370 00033 1
Mikesh, Robert and Shorzoe Abe. Japanese Aircraft 1910–1941. London: Putnam, 1990. 

Yokosuka
Imperial Japanese Navy
Arsenals